Rowing competitions at the 2011 Pan American Games in Guadalajara  took place from October 15 to October 19 at the Canoe & Rowing Course in Ciudad Guzman. The only difference between the Pan American rowing program and the Olympic program is, the women's eights is replaced with the women's lightweight single sculls.

Medal summary

Medal table

Men's events

Women's events

Schedule
All times are Central Daylight Time (UTC-5).

Entries
The following countries have entered athletes:

References